Lowell Howard Caylor (born June 17, 1941) is a former American football player who played one season with the Cleveland Browns. He played college football at Miami University 
.

References

1941 births
Living people
American football defensive backs
Miami RedHawks football players
Cleveland Browns players
Players of American football from Dayton, Ohio